Kumataro Ito ( Ito Kumataro; c. 1860 – c. 1930) was the illustrator on board the U.S. Bureau of Fisheries Steamer U.S.S. Albatross during the Philippine Expedition from 1907 to 1910.

Ito was probably recommended to Hugh M. Smith as an artist by Kamakichi Kishinouye, a Japanese ichthyologist and cnidariologist.

References

External links
Fish Illustrations by Kumataro Ito on vertebrates.si.edu

Japanese illustrators
1860s births
1930s deaths
Year of birth uncertain
Year of death uncertain